Rulers of Yaxchilan were leaders of the Maya civilization polity of Yaxchilan during its existence as a prominent city-state. The first high king (ajaw) was Yat Balam in the year 320. The dynasty probably ended in the late 9th century with the decline of Yaxchilan.  The greatest of the high kings were Itzamnaaj B'alam II (commonly called Shield Jaguar) and his son Yaxun B'alam IV (commonly called Bird Jaguar).

Known rulers

All dates AD.

Notes

References